Diogo de Macedo (Vila Nova de Gaia, Portugal, 22 November 1889 – Lisbon, Portugal, 19 February 1959) was a Portuguese painter, sculptor, and writer.

Sculpture
Sculpted, among others, the busts of: 
Antero de Quental ( 1929 )
Sara Afonso ( 1927 )
António Botto ( 1928 ) 
Mário Eloy ( 1932 )
some of the statues to the monumental fountain of Alameda ( 1940–1942)

1889 births
1959 deaths
Portuguese art critics
Portuguese sculptors
Male sculptors
Portuguese male writers
People from Vila Nova de Gaia
20th-century Portuguese painters
20th-century male artists
20th-century sculptors
University of Porto alumni
Portuguese male painters